Richard Bruce Craddock (February 19, 1944 – February 22, 1990) was an American football coach. He served as the head football coach at Northeast Missouri State University—now known as Truman State University—in Kirksville, Missouri from 1979 to 1982 and Western Illinois University in Macomb, Illinois and he from 1983 to 1989, compiling a career college football coaching record of 65–54–1.

Career
Craddock graduated in 1966 from Northeast Missouri State University—now known Truman State University—in Kirksville, Missouri—where he was a member of Phi Sigma Kappa fraternity. After serving in the Vietnam War, he began his coaching career at Northeast Missouri State as an assistant coach from 1970 to 1971. He was an assistant coach at the University of Vermont from 1972 to 1974, before returning to Northeast Missouri State in 1975 as an assistant. He was a guest coach for the Saskatchewan Roughriders of the Canadian Football League (CFL) from 1979 to 1982. Craddock was named head football coach at Western Illinois University in 1982.

Death
Craddock died on February 22, 1990, aged 46, after a 10-month battle against cancer in a Macomb, Illinois hospital. Physicians linked the cancer to his exposure to Agent Orange during the Vietnam War, where he was a United States Marine Corps captain from 1967 to 1970.

Head coaching record

References

External links
 

1944 births
1990 deaths
American football offensive linemen
Truman Bulldogs football coaches
Truman Bulldogs football players
Vermont Catamounts football coaches
Western Illinois Leathernecks football coaches
United States Marine Corps officers
United States Marine Corps personnel of the Vietnam War
Coaches of American football from Washington, D.C.
Players of American football from Washington, D.C.
American people of Welsh descent
Deaths from cancer in Illinois